In sailing, the throat halyard (or throat for short) is a line that raises the end of a gaff nearer to the mast, as opposed to the peak halyard which raises the end further from the mast. Such rigging was normal in classic gaff-rigged schooners and in other ships with fore-and-aft rigging. It is absent in Bermuda rigged boats.

References 

Sailing rigs and rigging